Badgerys Creek is an electoral district of the Legislative Assembly in the Australian state of New South Wales.

Located on the outskirts of Greater Western Sydney, Badgerys Creek takes in the suburbs of Badgerys Creek, Bringelly, Cecil Park, Erskine Park, Glenmore Park, Greendale, Horsley Park, Luddenham, Mount Vernon, Mulgoa, Oran Park, Regentville, St Clair, Wallacia and parts of Catherine Field, Cobbitty, Kemps Creek and Orchard Hills.

Badgerys Creek was first established in 1991, replacing Minchinbury. It was abolished in 1999 and replaced by Mulgoa. A redistribution ahead of the 2023 election abolished Mulgoa and re-established Badgerys Creek. Based on the results of the 2019 election, it is estimated to have a notional margin of 9.7 percent for the Liberal Party.

Members for Badgerys Creek

Election results

References

Former electoral districts of New South Wales
Constituencies established in 1991
1991 establishments in Australia
Constituencies disestablished in 1999
1999 disestablishments in Australia